Abdelhadi El Hachimi (born 15 December 1974) is a Belgian long distance runner who specialises in the marathon. He competed in the marathon event at the 2015 World Championships in Athletics in Beijing, China.

References

External links

1974 births
Living people
Belgian male long-distance runners
Belgian male marathon runners
World Athletics Championships athletes for Belgium
Place of birth missing (living people)